Goodeve is a village in the Canadian province of Saskatchewan within the Rural Municipality of Stanley No. 215 and Census Division No. 5. The village is the administrative centre of the Little Black Bear Cree First Nation band government.

History 
Goodeve incorporated as a village on August 18, 1910.

Demographics 

Notable residents
John Russell Kowalchuk - MLA for Melville and Minister of Natural Resources

See also

 List of communities in Saskatchewan
 Villages of Saskatchewan

References

Villages in Saskatchewan
Stanley No. 215, Saskatchewan
Division No. 5, Saskatchewan